Rita is a female given name, often a name in its own right, but mostly a shortened version of Margarita. The feast day of Rita is generally celebrated on May 22 in honor of Saint Rita of Cascia.
The following are notable people with the given name Rita.

In media and entertainment

In film, television and theater
 Rita Avila, Filipina actress
 Rita Bell (1893-1992), American singer, entertainer
 Rita Camarneiro (born 1988), Portuguese comedian and TV presenter
 Rita Christiani (1917–2008), Trinidad-born African-American dancer
 Rita Hayworth (1918–1987), American actress
 Rita Sririta Jensen (born 1981), Thai model and actress
 Rita Moreno (born 1931), Puerto Rican-born American actress
 Rita Raave (born 1951), Estonian actress
 Rita Ratnayake (1934–2006), Sri Lankan Sinhala cinema actress
 Rita Rätsepp (born 1962), Estonian actress
 Rita Romilly Benson (1900 – 1980), American actress and acting teacher
 Rita Rudner (born 1956), American comedian and writer
 Rita Simons (born 1977), English actress and singer
 Rita Tushingham (born 1942), English actress
 Rita Wilson (born 1956), American actress, singer, and producer

In journalism and literature
 Rita Mae Brown (born 1944), American writer and activist
 Rita Cosby (born 1964), American journalist
 Rita Deverell (born 1945), Canadian journalist
 Rita Dove (born 1952), American poet
 Rita Clay Estrada (born 1941), romance novelist
Rita Panahi, American-Iranian Australian opinion columnist
Rita Sebastian (died 1996), Sri Lankan journalist

In music
 Rita (Indian singer) (born 1984), stage name of Rita Thyagarajan, an Indian playback singer
 Rita (Israeli singer) (born 1962), stage name of Rita Yahan-Farouz Kleinstein, Persian-born Israeli singer and actress
 Rita (Japanese singer), Japanese voice actress, singer, and lyricist
 Rita Abatzi (1914–1969), Greek singer
 Rita Coolidge (born 1945), American singer
 Rita Daniela (born 1995), Filipina singer, actress and television host
 Rita Gorr (1926–2012), Belgian operatic mezzo-soprano
 Rita Guerra (born 1967), Portuguese singer
 Rita Hosking (born 1969), American singer-songwriter
 Rita Hunter (1933–2001), British operatic dramatic soprano
 Rita Kassabian, Armenian composer
 Rita Lee (born 1947), Brazilian musician
 Rita MacNeil (1944–2013), Canadian country and folk singer
 Rita Marley (born 1946), Jamaican singer and widow of Bob Marley
 Rita Ora (born 1990), British singer-songwriter 
 Rita Pavone (born 1945), Italian singer
 Rita Reys (1924–2013), Dutch jazz singer
 Rita Sakellariou (1934–1999), Greek singer
 Rita Simons (born 1977), English actress and singer
 Rita Steblin (1951–2019), Canadian musicologist
 Rita Streich (1920–1987), operatic soprano

In visual arts
 Rita Angus (1908–1970), New Zealand painter
 Rita Donagh (born 1939), British artist

Fictional characters 
 Rita, a female cat in the show Animaniacs
 Rita, in the franchise Jungledyret Hugo
 Rita, a Saluki dog in Disney film Oliver & Company
 Rita Bennett, in the TV series Dexter and the novels by Jeff Lindsay on which the series is based
 Rita Desjardin, from the book Carrie
 Rita Foster, in the film Cypher
 Rita Hanson, in the film Groundhog Day (as well as the musical of the same name)
 Rita Loud, in the TV series The Loud House
 Rita Malone, a female rat in the film Flushed Away
 Rita Mordio, in Tales of Vesperia
 Rita Repulsa, a villain in the TV series Mighty Morphin Power Rangers
 Rita Skeeter, in the Harry Potter franchise
 Rita Stapleton, in the TV series The Guiding Light
 Rita Sullivan, in the British soap opera Coronation Street
 Rita or Susan White, in Educating Rita
 Rita, the Cardcaptors name for the Cardcaptor Sakura character Rika Sasaki
 Rita Torres, in the TV series Exosquad
 Rita, a little girl in the series Jelly Jamm
 Rita, the head girl in the first books of the series The Naughtiest Girl

In government and politics
 Rita of Armenia (1278–1333), Empress of Byzantium
 Rita Baranwal, Assistant Secretary of Energy for Nuclear Energy, USA
 Rita Barberá (1948–2016), Spanish politician and mayor of Valencia
 Rita Borsellino (1945–2018), Italian politician
 Rita Crundwell (born 1953), American city comptroller convicted of fraud
 Rita Fan (born 1945), Hong Kong politician
 Rita Johnston (born 1935), Canadian politician 
 Rita Lau (born 1953), retired Hong Kong senior government official
 Rita Potts Parks (born 1962), American politician
 Rita Süssmuth (born 1937), German politician
 Rita Tamašunienė (born 1973), Lithuanian politician
 Rita Verdonk (born 1955), Dutch politician

In sport
 Rita Crockett (born 1957), American volleyball player 
 Rita Drávucz (born 1980), Hungarian water polo player 
 Rita Jeptoo (born 1981), Kenyan marathon runner
 Rita Tamašauskaitė (born 1941), Lithuanian rower

In other fields
 Rita of Cascia (1381–1457), Italian Augustinian saint
 Rita Atria (1974–1992), Italian anti-Mafia witness
 Rita R. Colwell (born 1934), environmental microbiologist
Rita Humphries-Lewin, Jamaican stockbroker and businesswoman
 Rita Jenrette (born 1949), former wife of U.S. Representative John Jenrette
 Rita Levi-Montalcini (1909–2012), Italian-American neurologist
 Rita de Acosta Lydig (1875–1929), American socialite
 Rita Jaima Paru, Papua New Guinean food entrepreneur 

Arabic feminine given names
English feminine given names
Estonian feminine given names
Given names derived from gemstones
Latvian feminine given names
Italian feminine given names
Albanian feminine given names
Swedish feminine given names
Danish feminine given names
Scandinavian feminine given names
Icelandic feminine given names
Finnish feminine given names
Norwegian feminine given names
Spanish feminine given names
Portuguese feminine given names